Only Human by Eileen Wilks is a short story in the Lover Beware anthology. It is also the first story in the World of the Lupi series. It came out in July 2003.

Plot summary
Eileen's story in the Lover Beware anthology is entitled Only Human. In it Lily is a Chinese-American detective working with the city of San Diego on a murder that appears to be the work of a werewolf. But, if she wants to find out who the killer is, she'll have to get inside the clans. She enlists the help of a were named Rule, though she detests his species. Will her prejudices hold up under the heat of passion?

Main characters
Lily Yu - a Chinese American sensitive who works for the Magical Crimes Division of the FBI
Rule Turner - the Nokolai Heir (or prince as the press like to dub him). His werewolf clan is located in San Diego, CA.
Cullen Seabourne - a recent adoption to Rule's Nokolai werewolf clan. Cullen was clanless for many years. He is also a sorcerer, which is a slightly illegal pastime according to the federal authorities. Eileen describes him as sin incarnate to look at.

Tie in with Tempting Danger
This romantic suspense novel is the first novel Eileen Wilks wrote set in the World of the Lupi. After her editor (and the fans) enjoyed it so much Eileen asked if she could expand this short story into a full-blown series. Tempting Danger expands on this story and ends up taking the characters in different directions than the original short story.

External links
Eileen Wilks Official website

2003 short stories
Short stories by Eileen Wilks
Werewolf written fiction
World of the Lupi books